The Green Mountain train wreck is the worst ever railroad accident in the state of Iowa. It occurred between Green Mountain and Gladbrook on the morning of March 21, 1910, and killed 52 people.

A train wreck earlier that morning at Shellsburg meant that the Rock Island Line trains were being diverted from Cedar Rapids to Waterloo over Chicago Great Western tracks via Marshalltown. The trains concerned were the No. 21 St Louis-Twin Cities and No. 19 Chicago-Twin Cities; which had been combined into a ten car train with the two locomotives travelling backwards, tender first. The new combined train now had two wooden cars sandwiched between the locomotives, a steel Pullman car, and other steel cars.

Between Green Mountain and Gladbrook, just east of the Marshall County border, the lead engine left the tracks and hit a clay embankment coming to a sudden stop. The steel cars sliced through the two wooden coaches: a smoking car and a ladies' day coach containing many children. There were no fatalities in the Pullman cars. One of the uninjured passengers said, "I saw women in the coach crushed into a bleeding mass, their bodies twisted out of human shape. I have seen what I shall see all my life when I dream." A relief train arrived two hours after the accident. It was later reported, "The sight was one of horribly crushed, mutilated, and dismembered bodies."

No official cause was ever released for the wreck, nor were any charges of neglect made although the crash did result in the introduction of new safety procedures.

References

External links
100th anniversary of record Iowa train wreck remembered
Gladbrook, IA Train Wreck, Mar 1910

Railway accidents in 1910
1910 disasters in the United States
Derailments in the United States
Railway accidents and incidents in Iowa
1910 in Iowa
Accidents and incidents involving Chicago, Rock Island and Pacific Railroad
Accidents and incidents involving Chicago Great Western Railway
Tama County, Iowa
March 1910 events